Last Tribe was a Swedish heavy metal/power metal band founded by guitarist Magnus Karlsson. 

Karlsson was born south of Sweden in 1973. He started playing guitar at age 10 and quickly joined many bands. In 1996, he started an education at Malmö College Of Music and was awarded a master's degree in music education in 2000. Karlsson joined the band Midnight Sun on the album Nemesis in 1999. He quickly received much attention due to his incredible skills with a guitar and decided that it was time for him to start his own band. The result was Last Tribe with their first album The Ritual in 2001. The album was widely successful and so the band decided to write another album, only this time, without Kristoffer and Pär. The two new members were bassist Dick Lövgren and drummer Jaime Salazar, going on to write two more albums together, Witch Dance in 2002 and The Uncrowned in 2003.

Members

Final line-up
Magnus Karlsson - guitar, keyboard and backing vocals
Rickard Bengtsson - vocals
Dick Lövgren - bass
Jaime Salazar - drums

Former members
Lee Day - guitar
Pär Wallmark - bass
Kristoffer "Doffe" Andersson - drums

Discography
The Ritual - 2001 - Frontiers/Avalon

Witch Dance - 2002 - Frontiers/Avalon

The Uncrowned - 2003 - Frontiers/Avalon

Swedish power metal musical groups
Musical groups established in 2000
Musical groups disestablished in 2003